Bayside (Cois Bá in Irish) is a small modern residential suburb on the Northside of Dublin, Ireland, commenced in 1967.

Location and access
Bayside is located beside the sea, lying inshore of North Bull Island and Dublin Bay, and about 10 km north-east of the city centre. Built in the 1970s, it is situated between Kilbarrack Road in Kilbarrack, from which it was formed and Baldoyle, and lies near Sutton.

Bayside is accessed from the main coastal road from the city centre to Howth, and easily accessible from Dublin city using the Dublin Area Rapid Transit (DART) suburban rail system, having its own station, which opened on 11 June 1973.  It can also be reached by Dublin Bus routes  17A, 31 and 32 and their variants, and route 105. It is also connected by a seafront cycleway to Sutton and to Fairview (with works ongoing to connect the cycleway to Sandymount).

The area lies within the civil parish of Kilbarrack and is made up of the townlands of Kilbarrack Upper and Kilbarrack Lower.

Governance and representation
Established under Dublin Corporation in 1967, the area was later allocated to Fingal County Council when County Dublin was split into three administrative areas.

Bayside was formerly (1937–1977 and 1981–2016) part of the Dublin North-East constituency. In 2016 it became part of the Dublin Bay North constituency. It is located within the electoral division known as "Sutton".

History

Bayside was a planned development in the later 1960s, on part of the lands of the large old district of Kilbarrack, whose largest settlement lay near what is now the centre of the new area. Title deeds for property in the area still show Kilbarrack. Kilbarrack's historic church and graveyard, formerly The Chapel of Mone, the mariners' church for Dublin, dating from the 13th century, lie about two thirds along Bayside's seafront.

In 2017 celebrations organised by the Bayside Community Association were held due to the suburb attaining its fiftieth year.

Development 
Built in the late 1960s and 1970s, Bayside falls within the postal district Dublin 13. Bayside comprises the estates of Sarto, Alden, Verbena, Montini, Roncalli, Sutton Park and associated roads including the Bayside Boulevards.  All of these roads are interconnected in an "island" development between the railway line and the coast road, with connection to outside roads only at Kilbarrack Road and to the coast road. Most properties within the development are two-storey terraced or semi-detached houses of 2-4 bedrooms.

Bayside train station was built on the line between Howth and the city centre in the early seventies. A decade later this line would become the first section of the Dublin Area Rapid Transport (DART) development.

There is park officially called "Bayside Park" but often known locally as the Lamb Chop.

Amenities
Bayside is built up around a central shopping and civic area. Plans to build a multi-storey apartment and retail complex at the location of the current shopping centre car-park were resisted by local residents from 2007 to 2011, but have, after multiple modifications, been approved by planning authorities. As of October 2017 work has been done to upgrade the centre, which includes installing a new three storey Aldi building, demolishing the squash courts and the community centre, some of the apartments and making the Spar general shop smaller.

There is a modern Roman Catholic parish church, the Church of the Resurrection, within this civic area.

The area has a chipper known as 'Munchies' which has been there for decades and the 'Bayside Inn'.

Education
There is one primary school, Scoil Mhuire agus Iosef,  and the district is serviced by a number of post-primary schools in nearby area.

Culture
Bayside is home to the Third Day Chorale multi-denominational musical group, operating since 1975.  Under the musical directorship of Ruaidhrí Ó Dálaigh the group meets every Wednesday night between 7:45 and 10:00 to sing a wide range of sacred and secular choral music.

People
Alex Barclay, crime fiction writer and former journalist
Martin Fay of The Chieftains was a resident in Bayside
Pat Hooper, Olympian
Ronan Keating of Boyzone is a former resident of Bayside.
Fergal O'Brien, professional snooker player, is a former resident
Averil Power, former Fianna Fáil Senator
Steve Wickham, of The Waterboys

References and footnotes

See also
 List of towns and villages in Ireland